Siân James (20 September 1930 – 21 July 2021) was a Welsh novelist, academic and translator, who wrote in English. Her third novel, A Small Country, is seen as a classic of Anglo-Welsh literature. Her 1996 short-story collection  Not Singing Exactly won the English-language category in Wales Book of the Year, the first book by a woman to do so.

Birth and academic posts
James, born in Coed-y-bryn in Ceredigion, attended the University of Wales, Aberystwyth. She was a Fellow of the University of Wales, Aberystwyth, and of the Welsh Academy. She taught on the University of Glamorgan's  Masters' degree in Creative Writing. She was later awarded an honorary doctorate by the university for her contribution to literature in Wales.

Writing career
Siân James twice won the Yorkshire Post Prize. Her third novel especially, A Small Country, has come to be regarded as a classic of Anglo-Welsh literature. In 2006, A Small Country was adapted as a Welsh-language TV series, Calon Gaeth, which won the 2007 Bafta Cymru award for Best Drama/Drama Serial for Television.

James translated Kate Roberts's novel Y Byw Sy'n Cysgu into English as The Awakening. She also published a memoir, The Sky Over Wales, in 1997. In the same year, her short-story collection Not Singing Exactly won the Wales Book of the Year award.

Family
In 1958 Siân James married the Welsh Shakespearean actor Emrys James and set up a home with him in London and later Worcestershire. They had four children, William, Owen, Jo and Anna. Emrys James died in 1989.

Works

One Afternoon (1975)
Yesterday (1978)
A Small Country (1979)
Another Beginning (1979)
Dragons and Roses (1983)
A Dangerous Time (1984)
Love and War (1994)
Storm at Arberth (1994)
Not Singing Exactly (collected short stories, 1996)
Two Loves (1997)
The Sky Over Wales (memoir, 1997)
Summer Storm (1998)
Second Chance (2000)
Outside Paradise (short stories, 2001)
Summer Shadows (2004)
Return to Hendre Ddu (2009)

References

External links
A Small Country used in postgraduate English courses

1930 births
2021 deaths
Welsh novelists
Alumni of Aberystwyth University
People from Carmarthenshire